Arsky Kamen (Ar Taşı) is a rural locality (a selo) in Sosnovsky Selsoviet, Beloretsky District, Bashkortostan, Russia. The population was 95 as of 2010. There are 3 streets.

Geography 
Arsky Kamen is located 18 km southwest of Beloretsk (the district's administrative centre) by road. Sosnovka is the nearest rural locality.

References 

Rural localities in Beloretsky District